Essendon North is a suburb in Melbourne, Victoria, Australia,  north-west of Melbourne's Central Business District, located within the City of Moonee Valley local government area. Essendon North recorded a population of 3,071 at the 2021 census.

Essendon North is adjacent to Essendon Airport. The airport was proclaimed by the Commonwealth Government in 1921, which had been known as St Johns, after an early landowner. Local residents complained about noise periodically from 1930. Commercial international flights were transferred to the new Melbourne Airport in 1970, and commercial domestic flights followed in 1971.

See also
 City of Essendon – Essendon North was previously within this former local government area.

References

Suburbs of Melbourne
Suburbs of the City of Moonee Valley